Alexander Bradley (September 19, 1851 – March 6, 1925), also known as Neil Bonner, was a United States Navy sailor and a recipient of the United States military's highest decoration, the Medal of Honor.

Biography
A native of Boston, Massachusetts, Bradley joined the Navy from that state. For this action, he was awarded the Medal of Honor two months later, on October 10.

Bradley's official Medal of Honor citation reads:
On board the U.S.S. Wachusett off Cowes, 7 August 1872. Jumping overboard into a strong tideway, Bradley attempted to save Philip Cassidy, landsman, of the U.S.S. Wabash, from drowning.

Bradley left the Navy while still a landsman. He died at age 73 and was buried at Holy Cross Cemetery in Akron, Ohio.

See also

List of Medal of Honor recipients in non-combat incidents

References

External links

1851 births
1925 deaths
People from Boston
United States Navy sailors
United States Navy Medal of Honor recipients
Burials in Ohio
Non-combat recipients of the Medal of Honor